Abdur Rahman ibn Yusuf Mangera (born 1974) is a Sunni Islamic scholar, author, and founder of Whitethread Institute and Zamzam Academy. He authored Fiqh al-Imam and Healthy Muslim Marriage. He featured in the 2020 edition of The 500 Most Influential Muslims compiled by the Royal Islamic Strategic Studies Centre.

Biography
Mangera graduated from Darul Uloom Bury and studied Ifta at the Darul Uloom Zakariyya in South Africa and then at the Mazahir Uloom Jadeed in Saharanpur, India. He received a B.A degree from the Rand Afrikaans University, Johannesburg and an M.A and PhD degree in Islamic Studies from the SOAS, University of London. He is authorized to transmit hadith from Habib Al-Rahman Al-Azmi (through his student Zayn al-‘Abidin), Abul Hasan Ali Hasani Nadwi, Muhammad al-‘Awwama, and Muhammad Yunus Jaunpuri.

Mangera established the Whitethread Institute and ZamZam Academy.  He featured in the 2020 edition of The 500 Most Influential Muslims. He was awarded an honorary fellowship at the Cambridge Muslim College in 2013 and at the Royal Aal al-Bayt Institute for Islamic Thought in Amman, Jordan in 2016.

In 2016, Mangera travelled to Kashmir to speak in Imam Abu Hanifa Conference which was organized by Darul Uloom Raheemiyyah in the Convocation Complex of the University of Kashmir.

Literary works
Mangera's books include:
 Fiqh al-Imam: Key Proofs in Hanafi Fiqh (1996)
 Prayers for Forgiveness: Seeking Spiritual Enlightenment through Sincere Supplication (2004)
 Provisions for the Seekers (2005), (translation and commentary of the Arabic work Zad al-Talibin compiled by Ashiq Ilahi Bulandshahri).
 Co-authored Reflections of Pearls (2005)
 Imam Abu Hanifa's Al-Fiqh al-Akbar Explained (2007)
 Salat & Salam: In Praise of Allah's Most Beloved (2007), a manual of blessings and peace upon the Prophet Muhammed
 Imaam Ghazali's Beginning of Guidance (Bidayah al-Hidaya) (2010)
 A Critical Edition of Abū’l-Layth al-Samarqandī's Nawāzil (PhD Thesis, 2013)
Healthy Muslim Marriage: Unlocking The Secrets to Ultimate Bliss

See also 
 List of Hanafis
 List of Ash'aris and Maturidis
 List of Deobandis

References

Living people
British Islamic studies scholars
Alumni of SOAS University of London
1974 births
Mazahir Uloom Jadeed alumni
Hanafis
Maturidis
People educated at Darul Uloom Bury
Islamic scholars in the United Kingdom
Deobandis